hp7 or variant, may refer to:

 HP7, the postcode for Amersham, see HP postcode area
 hP7, a Pearson symbol
 Harry Potter and the Deathly Hallows, the seventh Harry Potter novel
 Harry Potter and the Deathly Hallows – Part 1, the seventh Harry Potter film
 Harry Potter and the Deathly Hallows – Part 2, the second part of the seventh Harry Potter film
 Schreder HP-7, a glider
 Handley Page Type G a.k.a. H.P.7, an airplane
 Historic name for AA battery in the United Kingdom

See also
HP (disambiguation)